Married to the Mob is a 1988 American crime comedy film directed by Jonathan Demme, and starring Michelle Pfeiffer, Matthew Modine, Dean Stockwell, Mercedes Ruehl, and Alec Baldwin. Pfeiffer plays Angela de Marco, a gangster's widow from Brooklyn, opposite Modine as the undercover FBI agent assigned the task of investigating her mafia connections.

The film was released on August 19, 1988, by Orion Pictures. It earned positive reviews from critics and earned several accolades; Pfeiffer was nominated for a Golden Globe Award for Best Actress – Motion Picture Comedy or Musical, and Stockwell was nominated for an Academy Award for Best Supporting Actor.

Plot
Angela de Marco is the wife of Long Island mafia up-and-comer "Cucumber" Frank de Marco, who gets violently dispatched by his Don, Tony "The Tiger" Russo, when he is discovered in a compromising situation with the latter's mistress Karen. Angela wants to escape the criminal underworld with her son, but is harassed by Tony who puts the moves on her at Frank's funeral. This clinch earns her the suspicion of FBI agents Mike Downey and Ed Benitez, who are conducting surveillance, and also of Tony's wife Connie, who repeatedly confronts Angela with accusations of stealing her husband. To further complicate things, Downey is assigned to monitor all of Angela's movements as part of an undercover surveillance operation, but cannot resist becoming romantically involved with Angela himself. Angela's attempts to break away from the Mob result in comic mayhem and a climactic showdown in a honeymoon suite in Miami Beach.

Cast

In addition, short cameo appearances include the film's director, Jonathan Demme, as a man getting off an elevator in Miami, and the film's music supervisor, Gary Goetzman, as the guy playing piano when the mobsters gather at the "King's Roost" restaurant.

Release and reception
Married to the Mob received a largely positive response from critics. On Rotten Tomatoes, the film holds an approval rating of 90% based on 48 reviews, with an average rating of 7.30/10. The site's critics consensus reads: "Buoyed by Jonathan Demme's intuitive direction and Michelle Pfeiffer's irresistible charisma, Married to the Mob is a saucy mix of broad comedy and gangster drama." On Metacritic, the film has a weighted average score of 71 out of 100, based on 15 critics, indicating "generally favorable reviews".

Janet Maslin of The New York Times wrote that "Married to the Mob works best as a wildly overdecorated screwball farce... it also plays as a gentle romance, and as the story of a woman trying to re-invent her life." The Washington Post described the film as "all decked out in Godfather kitsch, but underneath its loud exterior, a complex heroine struggles for freedom." Variety called the film "fresh, colorful and inventive." Time Out wrote that although the film was "relentlessly shallow, the performances, music and gaudy visuals provide a fizzy vitality for which many other directors would give their right arm." Roger Ebert of the Chicago Sun-Times gave a more lukewarm review, but ended positively: "Still, Married to the Mob is loaded with wonderful offbeat touches... [and] most assuredly doesn't lack soul."

Jonathan Demme's direction was praised for its idiosyncrasy. The New York Times called him "American cinema's king of amusing artifacts: blinding bric-a-brac, the junkiest of jewelry, costumes so frightening they take your breath away." The Washington Post wrote that Demme "has nailed one with this playful, but dangerous, gangster farce."

The acting performances were widely acclaimed, especially that of Michelle Pfeiffer in a star-making turn, "her best performance to date." Richard Corliss of Time wrote that Pfeiffer was the "emotional anchor to his [Demme's] vertiginous sight gags." Variety claimed the "enormous cast is a total delight, starting with Pfeiffer." The Washington Post called Pfeiffer a "deft comedian... It's her movie, and she graces it." Matthew Modine was "winning", according to Variety.

Supporting players Dean Stockwell and Mercedes Ruehl also received praise for their performances. The Washington Post described Ruehl's character as "majestic in her jealousy, stealing scenes but never the show from the sweetly determined Pfeiffer." Maslin of The New York Times found that Pfeiffer and Modine were "readily upstaged by Miss Ruehl and, especially, by Mr. Stockwell. His shoulder-rolling caricature of this suave, foppish and thoroughly henpecked kingpin is the film's biggest treat." Variety described Stockwell as "a hoot."

Accolades

Music
 Married to the Mob (soundtrack)
 "Goodbye Horses"

Notes

References

External links
 
 
 
 
 
 
 
 Movieline interview with Dean Stockwell on the making of Married to the Mob

1980s crime comedy films
1988 films
1988 romantic comedy films
Adultery in films
American crime comedy films
American romantic comedy films
Films about the American Mafia
Films directed by Jonathan Demme
Films set in Miami
Films set in New York City
Films shot in Florida
Films shot in New Jersey
Films shot in New York City
Mafia comedy films
Orion Pictures films
1980s English-language films
1980s American films